Coleophora pseudofuscoaenea is a moth of the family Coleophoridae. It is found in Tunisia.

The length of the forewings is about 7.5 mm. Adults are on wing in May.

References

pseudofuscoaenea
Endemic fauna of Tunisia
Moths described in 2007
Moths of Africa